Mironovka is the name of several rural localities in Russia.

Mironovka, Altai Krai, a settlement in Zyryanovsky Selsoviet of Zarinsky District in Altai Krai; 
Mironovka, Belgorod Oblast, a khutor in Prokhorovsky District of Belgorod Oblast
Mironovka, Belogorsky District, Republic of Crimea, a selo in Belogorsky District of the Republic of Crimea
Mironovka, Krasnogvardeysky District, Republic of Crimea, a selo in Krasnogvardeysky District of the Republic of Crimea
Mironovka, Kaluga Oblast, a village in Kirovsky District of Kaluga Oblast
Mironovka, Republic of Mordovia, a village in Starosindrovsky Selsoviet of Krasnoslobodsky District in the Republic of Mordovia; 
Mironovka, Bagansky District, Novosibirsk Oblast, a selo in Bagansky District of Novosibirsk Oblast; 
Mironovka, Chistoozyorny District, Novosibirsk Oblast, a selo in Chistoozyorny District of Novosibirsk Oblast
Mironovka, Omsk Oblast, a village in Ilyichevsky Rural Okrug of Moskalensky District in Omsk Oblast
Mironovka, Ryazan Oblast, a village in Derevensky Rural Okrug of Spassky District in Ryazan Oblast
Mironovka, Saratov Oblast, a selo in Pitersky District of Saratov Oblast